The Fiji National Rugby Sevens Team has competed in the World Rugby Sevens Series, Rugby World Cup Sevens and the Olympics. Fiji won the gold medal in the inaugural rugby sevens at the Summer Olympics in 2016 in Brazil, the country's first Olympic medal in any event, and repeated as Olympic champions in the 2020 Summer Olympics in Tokyo, defeating New Zealand. Thus Fiji is the sole nation to have won Olympic gold in the sport. They are the only country in the world to have won the Sevens Treble (the Olympics, Sevens Series, and World Cup), the three major achievements in Sevens. They have won multiple World Rugby Sevens Series and Rugby World Cup Sevens. 

Fiji Sevens is watched and enjoyed by fans around the world for its style of play — the "Flying Fijians" play with Fijian flair. Their passing and offloads can be unorthodox for traditional rugby coaching, and more similar to basketball style.

History

The International Rugby Board (IRB) expanded the sevens rugby competition to become a series of 11 tournaments around the world. The debt the FRU incurred from the 2000 sevens series was significant. At the end of December 2000, the FRU was burdened with accumulated losses of F$933,306. Fiji appealed to the IRB for funding, arguing that the sevens tournament was built around Fiji and they would not be able to participate without such funding. From that appeal flowed participation funds that enabled the islands teams to play in the World Sevens Series fully funded.  By the end of November 2001, the FRU was sitting on a surplus of F$560,311 compared with the previous year's net loss of F$675,609.

The FRU again ran out of money in 2013 to support the national sevens team. The IRB had temporarily suspended funding due to concerns with FRU financial management and governance. The head coach went unpaid for months, another staff was terminated, and the team lacked funds for basic supplies such as rugby balls and bottled water.

Waisale Serevi is highly regarded as the best player ever in sevens rugby. Nicknamed the "maestro", played in this side from 1989 to 2006 leading them to countless tournament victories, two Sevens World Cups in 1997 and 2005.

World Rugby Sevens Series

Fiji has won the World Rugby Sevens Series four times — first in 2005-06, and most recently in 2018-19. Fiji is one of only two teams — along with New Zealand — to finish in the top four of the World Series every season since its inception.

Quadrennial tournaments

Summer Olympics

Rugby World Cup Sevens

Commonwealth Games

Tournament Victories

 World Sevens Series Winners (2005–06, 2014–15, 2015–16, 2018-19)
 Summer Olympics Gold (2016, 2020)
 Rugby World Cup Sevens Champions (1997, 2005,2022)
 Commonwealth Games: Silver (1998, 2002, 2018); Bronze (2006)
 Hong Kong Sevens Winners (1977, 1978, 1980, 1981, 1984, 1990, 1991, 1992, 1997, 1998, 1999, 2005, 2009, 2012, 2013, 2015, 2016, 2017, 2018, 2019)
 World Games Gold (2001, 2005, 2009)
 Pacific Games Gold (1995, 1999, 2003, 2007, 2015, 2019)
 Darwin Hottest Sevens  Winner (2005, 2006, 2007, 2008)
 Oceania Sevens Winners (2014, 2016, 2017, 2018, 2021)
 Gala Sevens Winner (1991)
 Australia Sevens Winners (2000, 2007, 2011, 2012, 2014, 2020)
 USA Sevens Winners (2007, 2015, 2016)
 Singapore Sevens Winners (2006, 2018)
 Scotland Sevens Winners (2009, 2015)
 Mar de Plata Winners (2000, 2002)
 New Zealand Sevens Winners (2000, 2006, 2010, 2018, 2019)
 South Africa Sevens Winners (1999, 2002, 2005, 2018)
 London Sevens Winners (2006, 2012, 2018, 2019)
 Dubai Sevens Winners (2013, 2015)
 Japan Sevens Winners (1995–97, 2000, 2014)

Players

Current squad
Fiji team for the 2020 Tokyo Olympics
Kalione Nasoko
Josua Vakurunabili
Meli Derenalagi
Iosefo Masi
Asaeli Tuivuaka
Semi Radradra
Vilimoni Botitu
Waisea Nacuqu
Napolioni Bolaca
Jiuta Wainiqolo
Aminiasi Tuimaba
Jerry Tuwai (c)

Former squads

Player records
The following section lists player records from the World Rugby Sevens Series. Players in bold are still active.

Most points: (updated September 2018)
 Waisale Serevi (1,310)
 Osea Kolinisau (1,272)
 William Ryder (987)
 Vatemo Ravouvou (981)
 Nasoni Roko (857)

Former players

In addition to the players listed above, other notable players include:

 Manasa Bari
 Sireli Bobo
 Vilimoni Delasau
 Temesia Kaumaia
 Ifereimi Naruma
 Norman Ligairi
 Timoci Matanavou
 Lepani Nabuliwaqa
 Vereniki Goneva
 Setareki Tawake
 Aisea Tuilevu
 Seru Rabeni
 Kameli Ratuvou
 Ifereimi Rawaqa
 Viliame Satala
 Jope Tuikabe
 Mosese Volavola
 Apolosi Satala
 Semisi Naevo
 Watekini Vunisa

Head coaches
 Gareth Baber (2016–present) - Baber has won the most tournaments by a Fiji 7s coach and has coached the side to their 4th World Series Title in 2019. In addition, Baber also coached the Fiji 7s side to victory by bringing the country's second gold medal at the 2020 Tokyo Olympics.
 Ben Ryan (2013–16) - Ryan coached the Fiji 7s side to 2 back-to-back world series titles and the country's first gold medal at the 2016 Rio Olympics.
 Waisale Serevi (2005–07; 2008–09) — Serevi coached/played in the side from 2005-2007 guiding Fiji to their first World Sevens Series title in the 2005/2006 season.
 Etuwate Waqa
 Ratu Kitione Vesikula
 Alifereti Dere (2010–13)
 Pauliasi Tabulutu (2004–06)
 Rupeni Ravonu
 Peni Veidreyaki
 Alifereti Cawanibuka
 Josateki Sovau
 Tomasi Cama (2001)
 Sanivalati Laulau
 Tevita Wainiqolo

See also

 Fiji Rugby Union
 Fiji national rugby union team

Bibliography
 McLaren, Bill A Visit to Hong Kong in Starmer-Smith, Nigel & Robertson, Ian (eds) The Whitbread Rugby World '90 (Lennard Books, 1989)

References

External links
 
 WorldRugby profile

Fiji national rugby union team
National rugby sevens teams